Zach Wajtknecht (born 8 February 1998) is a British speedway rider.

Career
At an early age Wajtknecht became a double World Champion, twice triumphing in the FIM 125cc Grasstrack Youth Gold Trophy. He followed up these successes by being crowned British 250cc Youth Champion in 2013 and winner of the FIM 250cc Longtrack Youth World Cup in 2014. These successes led to Zach being awarded the prestigious Pinhard trophy, a trophy he described himself as being "over the moon" to win.

Wajtknecht was handed his big break in Speedway by the newly reformed National League Birmingham Brummies ahead of the 2015 season, the team's first season in the third tier of British Speedway. The team was put together by former manager Phil Morris, the newly appointed FIM Race Director for the Speedway Grand Prix series. Morris described Wajtknecht as having "what it takes to enjoy a very successful speedway career"

In 2017, he won the British Under-19 Championship at Plymouth. His 2017 season was cut short in July when a crash at Swindon resulted in a ruptured spleen and punctured lung.

In 2019, he was the European Grasstrack champion.

In 2022, he finished second for the World Longtrack title, finishing 28 points behind Mathieu Trésarrieu in the 2022 Individual Long Track World Championship.

Results

Speedway
British League Record

Grasstrack

European Championship

British Masters

Longtrack

World Championship Grand-Prix
 2019 - 2 apps (14th) 25pts
 2020 - 2 apps (4th) 32pts
 2021 - 2 apps (15th) 8pts
 2022 - 6 apps (2nd) 88pts

World Team Championship
 2018 -  Morizes 6/46pts (with James Shanes, Adam Ellis & Chris Harris) 2nd
 2019 -  Vechta 16/41pts (with Chris Harris, Edward Kennett & Adam Ellis) 4th
 2022 -  Herxheim 29/47pts (with Chris Harris, James Shanes) 5th

References

External links
 Zach on GrasstrackGB
 Zach on British Speedway

1998 births
Living people
English motorcycle racers
British speedway riders
Birmingham Brummies riders
Somerset Rebels riders
Lakeside Hammers riders
Swindon Robins riders